Krzeczów  is a village in the administrative district of Gmina Wierzchlas, within Wieluń County, Łódź Voivodeship, in central Poland.

References

Villages in Wieluń County